Terje Riis-Johansen (born 15 March 1968) is a Norwegian politician for the Centre Party who is serving as county mayor of Vestfold og Telemark since 2020.

Riis-Johansen was born in Skien. He was elected to the Norwegian Parliament from Telemark in 1993, but was not re-elected in 1997. From 1997 to 1999, during the first cabinet Bondevik, he was appointed political advisor in the Ministry of Finance. In 2005, during the second cabinet Stoltenberg, he was appointed Minister of Agriculture and Food, but changed department in 2008 and served as Minister of Petroleum and Energy. On 4 March 2011 he was succeeded by fellow Centre Party politician Ola Borten Moe.

On the local level he was a member of Skien municipality council from 1991 to 1995. During the same term he was also a member of Telemark county council.

After the 2011 Norwegian local elections the local centre-right alliance was dissolved, and Riis-Johansen became Telemark's county mayor of a new centre-left coalition.

Riis-Johansen was a member of the board of Nei til EU from 1995 to 1997, of Telemark University College from 2000 to 2003 and of the Norwegian Farmers' Union from 2000 to 2005.

As county mayor, Riis-Johansen has launched a programme to attract more foreign investment to Telemark county, Invest in Telemark.

References

1968 births
Living people
Politicians from Skien
Centre Party (Norway) politicians
Members of the Storting
Ministers of Agriculture and Food of Norway
Petroleum and energy ministers of Norway
Chairmen of County Councils of Norway
20th-century Norwegian politicians